Bodden Town may refer to the following in Grand Cayman in the Cayman Islands:
Bodden Town (village)
Bodden Town (district)
Bodden Town FC, a football club from Bodden Town

See also
Bodden Town Mission House, Grand Cayman
Bodden (disambiguation)